Norman "Lou" Allinger (April 6, 1928 – July 8, 2020) was an American organic and computational chemist and Distinguished Research Professor Emeritus of Chemistry at the University of Georgia (UGA) in Athens.

Allinger received his B.S. from the University of California, Berkeley, in 1951 and his Ph.D. from the University of California, Los Angeles, in 1954. He was on the faculty at Wayne State University before coming to the University of Georgia as a research professor in 1969. He is known for his pioneering efforts in the use of computational chemistry, especially molecular mechanics, to solve a variety of chemical problems. He is the author of the MM2, MM3 and MM4 software packages.

Allinger served in the United States Army. He died on 8 July 2020 at the age of 92.

Honors and awards
1989 Arthur C. Cope Award
1991 Elected to the National Academy of Sciences
1994 Chemical Pioneer Award from the American Institute of Chemists
1996 Schrödinger Medal
2002 Benjamin Franklin Medal in Chemistry

References

External links
Allinger faculty page
University of Georgia Research bio page
2002 Franklin Medal in Chemistry

1928 births
2020 deaths
People from Alameda, California
Military personnel from California
Members of the United States National Academy of Sciences
University of Georgia faculty
Wayne State University faculty
University of California, Berkeley alumni
University of California, Los Angeles alumni
Schrödinger Medal recipients
Computational chemists